Central Arcade may refer to:
Central Arcade, Newcastle upon Tyne
Central Arcade, Leeds. See Briggate, Leeds#Arcades
Central Arcade, Wolverhampton